Emil Hallfreðsson (born 29 June 1984) is an Icelandic professional footballer who plays as a central midfielder or left winger for Italian  club Virtus Verona and the Iceland national team.

Club career

Early career
Primarily a left-sided midfielder, Emil was brought to Tottenham Hotspur by then Sporting Director Frank Arnesen in December 2004, having spent his formative years at FH Hafnarfjarðar of the Úrvalsdeild in Iceland.

Emil became a regular starter for the Tottenham Hotspur Reserves, and played a key part in the Spurs' 2005–06 Premier League Southern Reserve title win. He was then loaned out to Swedish side Malmö FF,. He enjoyed some success with Malmö, starting a majority of the games in the 2006 season, with a total of 24 appearances and eight goals. He then returned to England in the fall, after Malmö unsuccessfully tried to convince him to stay.

His aim had then been to make the Spurs first team, but in his remaining months at the club he was not selected for a single game. In July 2007, he was sold to Norwegian club Lyn, where he was slated to stay until 2010. His first match for the club was a friendly against Ham-Kam, followed by a 20-minute substitution in a league game away against Sandefjord. His first and only 90-minute appearance was against Bodø/Glimt in the Norwegian Cup, in which he delivered a fine cross to Dylan Macallister for the 1–0 goal and the win. Three days later, the club surprisingly announced that Emil would be leaving for Italy and Reggina.

Reggina
Emil played his first Serie A match on  26 August 2007 a 1–1 draw with Atalanta. In his first season, he played a regular role in Reggina's team, but in the second season he played less. In April 2009 he did, however, score a spectacular goal against Juventus; he scored the 2–1 goal for his team but the match ended 2–2.

Barnsley
Having not been selected to play for Reggina first match of the 2009–10 season at Coppa Italia, he completed a one-year loan to Football League Championship side Barnsley on 14 August 2009. He scored his first goal for Barnsley against Plymouth Argyle on 28 November 2009. However, the game was later abandoned due to a waterlogged pitch. His first goal did come two weeks later however, in the home game with Newcastle United, slamming home a Daniel Bogdanović cross from six yards. Emil's goal made it 1–1 in an eventual 2–2 draw.

Verona
On 31 August 2010, Reggina loaned him to Verona. His first season with Verona he was a regular starter and a decisive player in achieving promotion to Serie B. At the end of the season, Emil won the Mastino del Bentegodi award as the team's player of the year. Looking ahead to the upcoming Serie B season, on 22 June 2011, three days after winning the First Division play-off, Verona outbid Reggina to purchase his contract.

Udinese
On 30 January 2016, Emil joined Udinese, signing a contract until June 2018.

Frosinone
On 31 July 2018, Emil signed with Serie A side Frosinone.

Return to Udinese
On 1 March 2019, Emil signed for the second time to Udinese after the first half of the season to Frosinone.

Padova
On 4 January 2020, he signed with Serie C club Padova until the end of the 2019–20 season. On 16 September 2020, he signed a new contract with Padova for the 2020–21 season.

Virtus Verona
On 6 October 2021, Hallfreðsson signed a one-year contract for Serie C side Virtus Verona as a free transfer.

International career
Emil was selected for EURO 2016 by the Iceland national team.

In May 2018 he was named in Iceland's 23-man squad for the 2018 World Cup in Russia.

Career statistics

International

Scores and results list Iceland's goal tally first, score column indicates score after each Hallfreðsson goal.

References

External links

1984 births
Living people
Emil Hallfredsson
Emil Hallfredsson
Association football midfielders
Emil Hallfredsson
Emil Hallfredsson
Emil Hallfredsson
UEFA Euro 2016 players
2018 FIFA World Cup players
Emil Hallfredsson
Emil Hallfredsson
English Football League players
Tottenham Hotspur F.C. players
Barnsley F.C. players
Allsvenskan players
Malmö FF players
Eliteserien players
Lyn Fotball players
Serie A players
Serie B players
Serie C players
Reggina 1914 players
Hellas Verona F.C. players
Udinese Calcio players
Frosinone Calcio players
Calcio Padova players
Virtus Verona players
Emil Hallfredsson
Expatriate footballers in England
Expatriate footballers in Sweden
Expatriate footballers in Norway
Expatriate footballers in Italy
Emil Hallfredsson
Emil Hallfredsson
Emil Hallfredsson
Emil Hallfredsson